Pleurothallis pruinosa is a species of orchid plant native to Central and South America.

References 

pruinosa
Flora of Brazil
Flora of Colombia
Flora of Costa Rica
Flora of Cuba
Flora of the Dominican Republic
Flora of Ecuador
Flora of Guyana
Flora of French Guiana
Flora of Honduras
Flora of Jamaica
Flora of Puerto Rico
Flora of Trinidad and Tobago
Flora of Venezuela
Flora of Panama
Flora of Suriname
Flora of Peru
Flora without expected TNC conservation status